Charles Wayne Speyrer (born April 29, 1949) is a former American football wide receiver in the National Football League for the Baltimore Colts and the Miami Dolphins.  He played college football at the University of Texas.

Speyrer was a first-team all state running back at Port Arthur Jefferson High school and a two-time all american receiver at the University of Texas.  He is a member of the University of Texas Hall of Honor and the Cotton Bowl Hall of Fame and the only player ever named to the Cotton Bowl All-Decade team in two different decades.

Speyrer was a key play-maker in what is considered by some to be the most famous drive in Texas history. Texas was fresh off its famed 15–14 come-from-behind victory over No. 2 Arkansas in the "Game of the Century" with President Richard M Nixon in attendance. That victory earned Texas the right to represent the Southwest Conference in the Cotton Bowl where their opponent was eighth-ranked Irish, featuring Joe Theismann. This was Notre Dame's first bowl game in 40 years, but early on, the game had the makings of a big upset when Notre Dame charged out to a 10–0 lead.

Starting on their own 24-yard line, the Longhorns embarked upon a fourth-quarter, 17-play march that included a pair of fourth-and-two conversions, the last coming at the Notre Dame 10 when James Street completed a clutch pass to a diving Speyrer that took the Horns to the two. From there, it took three plays before Billy Dale pushed the ball over the goal line to cement UT's second national title—Texas 21, Notre Dame 17.

Speyrer is also known for his last minute touchdown catch during his senior year in a come-from—behind win during the Texas–UCLA game in the fall of 1970.  The catch and victory was a key part of Texas finishing the regular season undefeated where they were awarded their 3rd National title (1963, 1969 & 1970) by the UPI Coach's Poll.

Speyrer was the 38th overall selection in the second round of the 1971 NFL Draft by the Washington Redskins. He never played a game with Washington before being traded along with a 1973 first-round pick (25th overall–traded to San Diego Chargers for Marty Domres) to the Colts for Roy Jefferson and ninth-rounders in 1973 (218th overall–Rick Galbos) and 1974 (213th overall–traded to Los Angeles Rams for Joe Sweet) on July 31, 1971. He spent four seasons in the NFL, three with the Colts, and one final year with the Miami Dolphins.

References

1949 births
Living people
Sportspeople from Port Arthur, Texas
American football wide receivers
Texas Longhorns football players
Baltimore Colts players
Miami Dolphins players